Gather or Gather.com was a social networking website designed to encourage interaction by discussion of various social, political and cultural topics. Its headquarters were located in Boston, Massachusetts. It became defunct in 2015.

History
The website was founded in 2005 by Tom Gerace, an entrepreneur who previously founded the affiliate marketing company, Be Free. Gather attracted investments and partnerships from media companies ranging from McGraw-Hill and Hearst Publications to American Public Media and a member of the McClatchy family. Starbucks chose Gather over other social networking sites because of its adult demographic. Lotus founder Jim Manzi was an early investor. Gather was one of very few 2006 startups to use television advertising.

Demographics

The countries where the site was most visited were (in descending order):
 41.5%
 27%
 4.9%
 4.3%
 (UK) 3.3%
 2.1

Operations
Members received their own subdomain, where they could publish articles and share comments. Also, members could create groups pertaining to their own efforts, or to any other topic. Writers could also comment on each other's works.

In 2010, Gather management, including owner Tom Gerace, started a business-making subdomain entitled "The Gather News Channel." This consisted of a series of subdomains such as Celebrities, Entertainment, Business, Technology, Politics, Sports and News. Writers were paid to write short articles on a subject for which they were selected from the above topics. Additional money was possible based on a formula of revenue per views. The "Gather News Channel" existed until 2014 when Gather Inc., including Gather.com, was sold to Kitara Media.

In October, 2015, Gather became defunct.

References

External links
CEO Tom Gerace interview, Social Networking Watch, Nov '08 

Defunct social networking services
American political blogs